is a talent management company in Japan. It was founded in October 1979. It is located in Roppongi.

Subsidiaries 
 Ken-On Incorporated
 Ken Kikaku Incorporated
 MC Cabin Music Publishing
 RAD Japan
 Taisuke Management
 Pin-ups Artists

Actors

Female

Male 
 Ikki Sawamura
 Sota Fukushi
 Takashi Sorimachi
 Toshiki Seto
 Yutaka Takenouchi
 (( YUTA FURUKAWA ))

Next Generation

Voice actors

Musical artists

Jointly managed groups and artists

Former talents
 Ayaka (under a stAtion)
 Makiko Esumi
 Nanami Hinata
 Rosa Kato
 Tomoko Kawase (under NinetyOne)
 Shota Matsuda
 Hiro Mizushima (under a stAtion)
 Hatsune Okumura

References

External links 
 

 
Japanese talent agencies
Mass media companies established in 1979
Japanese companies established in 1979